Simeon (Simon) Olelkovich (1420–1470) was the last Prince of Kiev from 1454 to 1470 and the Prince of Slutsk from 1443 to 1455.

A member of the Olelkovich family, he descended from Ruthenianized Eastern Orthodox branch of the Gediminids dynasty and was a great-grandson of Algirdas, the Grand Duke of Lithuania. After his father's death he inherited the Principality of Kiev. He conducted an independent policy, fought with the Crimean Tatars, maintained close ties with the Principality of Moldavia, the Genoese colonies and the Principality of Theodoro in the Crimea. However soon after, the Principality of Theodoro was conquered by the emerging Crimean Khanate.

He married Maria (d. 1501), daughter of Jan Gasztołd, by whom he had three children, Vasily (d. 1595), Alexandra, wife of Fedor Ivanovich Borovsky, and Sophia (d. 1483), wife of Mikhail III of Tver, the last Prince of Tver. 

After the death of Simon Olelkovich, the Principality of Kiev was transformed into the Kiev Voivodeship. His son received the Principality of Pinsk as compensation, but he died young and was succeeded first by his mother, Maria, and then by his brother-in-law, Fedor, after her death. None of his children had any issue.

See also
 List of Ukrainian rulers

References

Sources
 F. Shabuldo. Simon Olelkovich // Encyclopedia of History of Ukraine, 2012. p 522. 
 Леонтій ВОЙТОВИЧ. КНЯЗІВСЬКІ ДИНАСТІЇ СХІДНОЇ ЄВРОПИ (кінець IX — початок XVI ст.): склад, суспільна і політична роль. Історико-генеалогічне дослідження. - Львів, 2000 р 
 Г. Івакін. Історичний розвиток Києва XIII — середина XVI ст. — К., 1996. — С. 42-108. 
 Długosz Jan. Dziejów polskich… — Tom V. — 1870 — S. 515 
 Semkowicz W. Gasztołd Jan (Iwaszko) // Polski Słownik Biograficzny. — Kraków, 1948—1958. — t. VII. — S. 298. 

Gediminids
Burials at Kyiv Pechersk Lavra
People from Slutsk
1420 births
1470 deaths